The Wainwright Bisons are a junior "B" ice hockey team based in Wainwright, Alberta, Canada. They are members of the North Eastern Alberta Junior B Hockey League (NEAJBHL). They play their home games at Peace Memorial Multiplex.

History
Since the 1990–91 season the Wainwright Bison have three league championships winning in the 2001, 2016 and 2017 playoffs.  The victory advanced the Bison to the Russ Barnes Trophy championships which is the Alberta Provincial Jr. B Championships featuring eight teams.  The Heritage and Capital Hockey leagues qualify their playoff champion and playoff finalist, while the Calgary Jr. B, North West, and the North East Hockey leagues send just their playoff champions.  The final team is the team selected to host the tournament event.

In 2013, Wainwright was the Russ Barnes host and as such participated in their second Provincial Championship. In 2016, the Bisons advanced to the Provincial Championship but as the league champion.  In 2017, the team won the league championship to advance and win the Russ Barnes Trophy and advanced to the Keystone Cup. Here they won the Western Canadian Junior B Championship with an overtime win in the final game.

Season-by-season record

Note: GP = Games played, W = Wins, L = Losses, OTL = Overtime Losses, Pts = Points, GF = Goals for, GA = Goals against, PIM = Penalties in minutes

Russ Barnes Trophy
Alberta Jr. B Provincial Championships

Keystone Cup
Western Canadian Jr. B Championships (Northern Ontario to British Columbia)Six teams in round-robin play. 1st vs. 2nd for gold/silver & 3rd vs. 4th for bronze.

NHL alumni
Shawn Heins
Gordon Mark
Jeff Woywitka

External links
Wainwright Bisons

Ice hockey teams in Alberta